Amblyseius chungas is a species of mite in the family Phytoseiidae.

References

chungas
Articles created by Qbugbot
Animals described in 1989